Bad faith may refer to:

 Insurance bad faith, a legal term of art
 Bad faith (existentialism), a philosophical concept used by existentialist philosophers Jean-Paul Sartre and Simone de Beauvoir
 "Bad Faith" (Law & Order), an episode of the TV series Law & Order
 Bad Faith, a fictional rock band in the New Tricks TV series episode "Loyalties and Royalties"
 Bad Faith, a political podcast hosted by Briahna Joy Gray and Virgil Texas